The 1996 Munster Senior Hurling Championship Finals were two hurling matches played in July 1996. The first game was played at the Gaelic Grounds in Limerick and finished in a draw 0–19 to 1–16 after Tipperary at one stage had a ten-point lead. The replay was played a week later on 14 July at Páirc Uí Chaoimh, Cork, County Cork, and saw Limerick claim their second first Munster Championship of the decade, winning on a scoreline of 4–7 to 0–16.
Overall, this was Limerick's eighteenth Munster Senior Hurling Championship title.

Tipperay had defeated Waterford in the quarter-final by 1–14 to 1-11 and Kerry in the semi-final by 4–19 to 2–11 to reach the final, while Limerick had defeated Cork by 3–18 to 1–8 in the quarter-final and All-Ireland Champions Clare by 1–13 to 0–15 in the semi-final to reach the final.
Both matches were screened live by RTÉ as part of The Sunday Game programme.

Match details

References

See also
 Limerick–Tipperary hurling rivalry

Munster
Munster Senior Hurling Championship Finals
Hurling in County Limerick
Tipperary GAA matches